Bacteriovoracales is an order of bacteria.

References 

Bacteria orders